The 1964 NCAA College Division football season was the ninth season of college football in the United States organized by the National Collegiate Athletic Association at the NCAA College Division level.

Conference standings

Rankings

College Division teams (also referred to as "small college") were ranked in polls by the AP (a panel of writers) and by UPI (coaches). The national champion(s) for each season were determined by the final poll rankings, published at or near the end of the regular season, before any bowl games were played.

College Division final polls
In 1964, UPI's top ranked team was 9–0 Cal State Los Angeles. 8–0 Wittenberg was top ranked by the AP panel, and second in the UPI poll.

Associated Press (writers) final poll
Published on November 25

Denotes team played a game after AP poll, hence record differs in UPI poll

United Press International (coaches) final poll
Published on December 3

Bowl games
The postseason consisted of four bowl games as regional finals, played on December 12.

See also
 1964 NCAA University Division football season
 1964 NAIA football season

References